Cowboys, Sisters, Rascals & Dirt is an album by American country music artist Waylon Jennings, released in 1993 through the labels BMG and Ode 2 Kids. A concept album, it features Jennings singing compositions intended for children. All of the tracks on the record were written by the singer himself. The final song is dedicated to Jennings' son, Shooter. While a music video for "Cowboy Movies" was filmed, the album itself did not chart. The album was recorded by Rodney Good and produced by Cliff "Barny" Robertson, whose daughters, Becky, Emily and Joanna, sing backing vocals on it. In the mid-2000s, the daughters founded a group called Carter's Chord.

Track listing
All tracks written by Waylon Jennings except where noted.
"I'm Little" – 2:57
"I Just Can't Wait" – 2:34
"When I Get Big" – 2:11
"All of My Sisters Are Girls" – 2:59
"A Bad Day" – 3:09
"Dirt" – 2:36
"Cowboy Movies" – 3:01
"If I Could Only Fly" – 2:34
"Useless (The Little Horse That Didn't Grow)" (Waylon Jennings, Shooter Jennings) – 5:23
"Small Packages" – 2:14
"Shooter's Theme" – 2:15

Personnel
 Jerry Bridges - bass
 Kellie Cunningham - background vocals
 Sonny Curtis - acoustic guitar
 Glen Duncan - fiddle
 Jeff Hale - drums
 Cristana Lund - background vocals
 Brant Mackey - background vocals
 Terry McMillan - harmonica, percussion
 Barny Robertson - keyboards
 Emily Robertson - background vocals
 Joanna Robertson - background vocals
 Joseph Sarles - background vocals
 Caroll Spinney - Oscar The Grouch
 Robby Turner - steel guitar, mandolin, banjo, dobro
 Waylon Jennings - vocals, electric guitar

References

Waylon Jennings albums
1993 albums